Jacek Lusiński (born 30 April 1969) is a Polish film director, scriptwriter, lyricist, and author of the book Carte Blanche, published by Axis Mundi. He makes feature films, documentaries, commercials and video clips. He graduated from the Łódź Film School.

Cinematography 
 2004 – „Niezła Jazda” ("A Jolly Good Ride") – (feature length) – scriptwriter and director
 2007 – „Wrzesien 39” ("September 39") – a documentary series made for Discovery and TVN channels – scriptwriter (co-written with Paweł Sliwinski), director
 2009 – „Piksele” ("Pixels") – scriptwriter and director
 2010 – „Polska liga cudzoziemska” ("Polish Foreign League") – a documentary series (Polsat TV) scriptwriter (Season 1 hosted by Piotr Kedzierski)
 2011 – „Polska liga cudzoziemska” ("Polish Foreign League") – a documentary series (Polsat TV) scriptwriter (Season 2 hosted by Olaf Lubaszenko)
 2015 – "Carte Blanche" – a feature film – scriptwriter and drirector

Other work 
Lusinski is the author of the book Carte Blanche, published by Axis Mundi in 2015.

Awards and honorable mentions 
 Main Prize – Script Pro Contest 2019
 Finalist Script Pro Contest 2012
 Finalist Script Pro Contest 2019 
 "Pixels" – "Brown Granate" award at the Comedy Film Festival in Lubomierz
 "Pixels" – Nominated to "Zlota Kaczka" award for the best director
 "Pixels" – Nominated to "Zlota Kaczka" award for the best script
 Finalist of the "Script Pro 2012" contest with the script of the feature film "Carte Blanche"
 "Carte Blanche" – Jury Grand Prix at 18th Shanghai International Film Festival (the jury presided by Andrey Zvyagintsev)
 "Carte Blanche" – " Jury’s Honorable Mention – 39th São Paulo International Film Festival MOSTRA (the jury presided by Geraldine Chaplin)
 "Carte Blanche" – Audience Award at the 8th "Wisła" Polish Film Festival in Moscow
 "Carte Blanche" – Jury's Honorable Mention at 44th Lubuskie Film Summer, Łagów 2015
 "Carte Blanche" – " Best Actor Award in a Leading Role Andrzej Chyra – China Golden Rooster & Hundred Flowers Film Festival
 "Carte Blanche" – "Special Award for Best Actor in a Leading Role for Andrzej Chyra – BAP Cine Festival Buenos Aires
 "Carte Blanche" – " Best Actor Award in a Leading Role" for Andrzej Chyra – The New York Polish Film Festival
 "Carte Blanche" – "Whitebox" – Best sound Award – BlueBox Festival Olsztyn
 "Carte Blanche" – Main Award – Toronto Polish Film Festival
 "Carte Blanche" – novel – 2nd place "Book of the Year 2015 – plebiscite by lubimyczytac.pl
 "Carte Blanche" – The best producer's debut award 2015 – Polish Audiovisual Producers Chamber of Commerce
 "Carte Blanche" – The Best Fiction Movie – 2016 – International Disability Film Festival – Barcelona

References

External links 
 Jacek Lusiński at the http://www.lusinski.com
 Jacek Lusiński at the http://www.filmpolski.pl/fp/index.php?osoba=1160978 database
 http://mlodzi.kipa.pl/nagroda-za-najlepszy-debiut-producencki-przyznana/
 http://inclus.cat/en/2016/so/carte-blanche.html
 https://scriptpro.pl/2019/05/01/3616/
 https://offcamera.pl/news/to-bedzie-historia-o-kobiecie-nagroda-script-pro/970

1969 births
Living people
Polish film directors